Bioculture is the second studio album by Electro Assassin, released in November 1993 by Hyperium Records. The album was reissued on 16 May 1995 by Metropolis Records for distribution in the United States.

Reception

AllMusic awarded Bioculture two and a half out of five possible stars. Sonic Boom said "the band has not broken any new musical ground" but "gone are the childishly stupid cyber happy mentalities, the music actually has some semblance of structure." EST criticized the loud production but claimed "Electro Assassin knows what is expected and delivers it with style; EA has taken care with the bass lines and percussion and could teach some of the bigger names a thing or two in the effective use of spoken word samples." The critic went on to say "fans of FLA's Caustic Grip and all that came after it should definitely track Bioculture down."

Track listing

Personnel
Adapted from the Bioculture liner notes.

Electro Assassin
 Kevin Gould – instruments
 Richard McKinlay – instruments
 Ian Taylor – vocals

Release history

References

External links 
 
 Bioculture at iTunes

1993 albums
Metropolis Records albums
Electro Assassin albums